Flower anemone may refer:

 Anemone, a type of flower
 Phymanthus crucifer, a type of sea anemone